The 1912 United States presidential election in Massachusetts took place on November 5, 1912, as part of the 1912 United States presidential election, which was held throughout all contemporary 48 states. Voters chose 18 representatives, or electors to the Electoral College, who voted for president and vice president.

Massachusetts was won by the Democratic nominees, New Jersey Governor Woodrow Wilson and his running mate, Indiana Governor Thomas R. Marshall. Opposing him were the Republican nominees, incumbent President William Howard Taft and Vice President James S. Sherman, and the Progressive Party candidates, former President Theodore Roosevelt and his running mate California Governor Hiram Johnson. Also in the running was the Socialist Party candidate, Eugene V. Debs, who ran with Emil Seidel.

Wilson won Massachusetts with a plurality of 35.53% of the vote, Taft came in second, with 31.95%, and Roosevelt came in third, with 29.14%, Wilson's margin over Taft being 3.58%. Debs came in fourth, with 2.58% of the total vote. In terms of margin, Massachusetts was about 11% more Republican than the national average.

Massachusetts had long been a typical Yankee Republican bastion in the wake of the Civil War, having voted Republican in every election from 1856 through 1908. However, in 1912, former Republican President Theodore Roosevelt decided to run as a third-party candidate with his Bull Moose Party against incumbent Republican President William Howard Taft, splitting the Republican vote and allowing Woodrow Wilson as the Democratic candidate to win Massachusetts with a plurality of only 35.53% of the vote. Were Taft and Roosevelt voters united behind a single Republican candidate, they would have taken a combined majority of over 61% of the vote, but the split would instead prove fatal to the Republicans both nationally and in Massachusetts. 1912 marked the first time in history that Massachusetts had ever given its electoral votes to a Democratic presidential candidate.

Theodore Roosevelt finished strong for a third-party candidate with 29.14% of the vote, about 2% more than he received nationally, although Massachusetts was not amongst his strongest states. Nonetheless, Roosevelt’s performance remains as of 2022 the best-ever third-party presidential performance in Massachusetts. The state's traditional Republican voters, especially in rural Western Massachusetts, proved to be mostly loyal to President Taft as the official Republican nominee. While Roosevelt came in second place nationally ahead of Taft, in Massachusetts, Taft beat Roosevelt and finished second behind Wilson.

Taft carried the most counties in Massachusetts, winning 6 of the state's 14 counties, while Wilson and Roosevelt each took 4. Taft’s support was strongest in Western and Central Massachusetts, his most significant win being Worcester County, where he won with over 40% of the vote. Roosevelt was strongest in the southeast part of the state, his overall most significant win being Plymouth County, where he won with over 40% of the vote. Roosevelt's most populous county win was Norfolk County, although he only won it with a plurality of less than forty percent of the vote.

However Wilson was able to edge them out statewide by holding on to the Democratic base of support in the cities. Wilson's most important county victory by far was winning Suffolk County, home to the state's capital and largest city, Boston, winning it with over 40% of the vote. Hampden County, home to the city of Springfield, provided Wilson another key win, although with a plurality of less than 40% of the vote. Wilson also won heavily populated Middlesex County with a plurality of less than 40% of the vote. Middlesex County would not vote Democratic again until 1948.

While, due to vote-splitting, Massachusetts finally voted Democratic for the first time ever in 1912, this was not indicative of any long-term trend at the time. With the Republican base re-united in 1916, Massachusetts returned to the Republican column, and remained solidly Republican until 1928.

Results

Results by county

See also
 United States presidential elections in Massachusetts

Notes

References

Massachusetts
1912
1912 Massachusetts elections